The Fiesta Alegre fronton was a fronton located on the intersection of the streets Marqués de Urquijo and Juan Álvarez Mendizabal, in the Argüelles area, in Madrid, Spain.

History 
The Madrilenian Fiesta Alegre fronton was designed by the architect Francisco Andrés Octavio Palacios and opened to the public in 1892. Originally, it had a 70-meters track and capacity to host 3,500 spectators, an important volume for the time.

References 

Fronton (court)
Former sports venues in Madrid
Sports venues completed in 1892
Demolished buildings and structures in Madrid
Neoclassical architecture in Spain
Defunct sports venues in Spain
1892 establishments in Spain